WSBI (1210 AM, "Radio Vida") is a daytime-only radio station broadcasting a Spanish Christian music format. It is licensed to Static, Tennessee, United States, and is owned by Iglesia Hispana de Nashville Inc.

WSBI programming is a simulcast of WYXE.

From its sign on date in 1986 until August 22, 2009, the station broadcast a country music format.

References

External links
 

Pickett County, Tennessee
Radio stations established in 1986
1986 establishments in Tennessee
SBI
SBI
SBI